Alan Philip Larson is a diplomat and a former United States Ambassador to the Organisation for Economic Co-operation and Development (OECD) (1990–93). He served as US Undersecretary of State for Economic, Business, and Agricultural Affairs (1999–2005) and is a member of  the American Academy of Diplomacy.

References

External links

Ambassadors of the United States to the Organisation for Economic Co-operation and Development
United States Career Ambassadors
United States Under Secretaries of State
Living people
Year of birth missing (living people)